The Grigorovich M-23bis was a Soviet biplane flying boat built during the 1920s.

Design
Dmitri Grigorovich developing the M-23 as a derivative of the Grigorovich M-9 with a more powerful engine. The first M-23 design was abandoned after the revolution and transformed into an improved design, the M-23bis, in 1922. The aircraft was completed at GAZ-3 "Krasnyj Letchik" (The Red Pilot) in mid-Summer 1923, but the unsuccessful hull shape meant that it failed to take off. The M-23bis was sent back for modifications, but in late 1923 was destroyed by a flood at the Krestovsky Island hangar.

Specifications (M-23bis)

References

Bibliography

M-23
Flying boats
Biplanes
Single-engined pusher aircraft